The 15th Medical Battalion was a non-combat battalion of the German Army Medical Service during the First World War, the interwar period and the Second World War. It was based in Frankfurt and Kassel and consisted of personnel from Hesse.

Organization

It consisted of the following squadrons:
Aschaffenburg Medical Squadron
Büdingen Medical Squadron
Frankfurt/Main Medical Squadron
Fulda Medical Squadron
Hanau Medical Squadron
Ohrdruf Medical Squadron

History
The battalion was established during the German Empire as a battalion of the Royal Prussian Army and saw active service during the First World War. In 1919, its headquarters was moved to Kassel and it was merged with the 11th Medical Battalion. From the 1930s it was attached to the IX Army Corps and headquartered in Frankfurt. The battalion exclusively saw service in a medical capacity and thus held non-combatant status under the laws of war.

Personnel

Most of the personnel of the 15th Medical Battalion were conscripted officers and soldiers, and included military physicians and other medics.

Commanding officers
Colonel (later Major-General) Dr August Blum (1889–1952), 1938–26 August 1939
Colonel (later Brigadier General) Dr Georg Ludewig (1887–1962), 11 June 1940 – 11 June 1941

References

Literature
 Alex Buchner, The German Army Medical Corps in World War II, Schiffer Publishing (Schiffer Military History), 1999, originally published in German as Der Sanitätsdienst des Heeres 1939–1945, Podzun-Pallas, 1995, 

Army Medical Service (Germany)
Organisations based in Frankfurt